The Compleat Tavern is a 1981 fantasy role-playing game supplement published by Gamelords.

Contents
The Compleat Tavern features guidelines on tavern accommodations, employees, and clientele, as well as rules of running games of skill and chance, and a system for barroom brawls.

Reception
William A. Barton reviewed The Compleat Tavern in The Space Gamer No. 39. Barton commented that "The Compleat Tavern should prove a valuable play aid to those FRP gamemasters who haven't the time or inclination to create from scratch every aspect of their fantasy worlds - and it can even be adapted to such diverse systems as Traveller and ''Villains & Vigilantes."

References

Fantasy role-playing game supplements
Role-playing game supplements introduced in 1981